Burd Isabel and Earl Patrick or Burd Bell (Child ballad # 257; Roud # 107) is a traditional folk song framed with explicit warnings about loving above your station.

Synopsis
Burd Isabel, a servant, becomes pregnant.  When she bears a son, Earl Patrick, the boy's father, resolves to marry her, but is persuaded not to, by his family.  Soon, he marries a duke's daughter.  He resolves to bring his son to his home, but first he sends his aunt (or great-aunt) and then goes himself, to the same effect:  Burd Isabel refuses to give her son up.

See also
List of the Child Ballads

External links
 Burd Isabel and Earl Patrick

Child Ballads
Year of song unknown
Songwriter unknown